Lorenza Pilar García Seta (16 January 1928 – 2 June 1996), known professionally as Pilar Lorengar, was a Spanish (Aragonese) soprano. She was best known for her interpretations of opera and the Spanish genre Zarzuela, and as a soprano she was known for her full register, a youthful timbre as well as a distinctive vibrato.

Early career
Lorengar was born in the El Gancho district of Zaragoza. At a very young age she participated in a radio program called Ondas Infantiles, organized by Radio Zaragoza; she began formal music lessons at the age of fourteen under Margarita Martínez. She moved to Barcelona to study at the Barcelona Music Conservatory and began performing incognito under the name Loren Arce in various halls in order to pay for her lessons. She studied in  Madrid under Spanish lyric soprano Ángeles Otein, and she also studied in West Berlin with Carl Ebert and mezzo-soprano Hertha Klust, Dietrich Fischer-Dieskau's teacher.

Lorengar became a member of the chorus of the Teatro de la Zarzuela around 1949. She made her professional debut in 1950 in Oran, Algeria, playing the role of Maruxa. In 1951 she made her Spanish debut in the principal role in the Zarzuela El canastillo de fresas (The Strawberry Basket). In 1952, she performed as a soloist in Barcelona in Beethoven's Ninth Symphony and also in Brahms' Requiem.

International career
Her international opera career started in 1955 at the Festival international d'Art Lyrique in Aix-en-Provence, where she played Cherubino in The Marriage of Figaro. She went on to play in London, Glyndebourne and Buenos Aires. In 1958 she signed a contract with the Deutsche Oper Berlin, a relationship that would last for thirty years. Her first performance for the Deutsche Oper took place a few months later, in 1959. In 1963 she was distinguished with the title of Kammersängerin by the Senate of Berlin.

In 1961, she first performed at the Salzburg Festival as Ilia in Idomeneo. She went on to play Desdemona in Otello at the San Francisco Opera, Violetta in La traviata at the Deutsche Oper in Berlin, and Donna Elvira in Don Giovanni at the Metropolitan Opera. Through her career she performed in Madrid, Brussels, La Scala at Milan, Liceu at Barcelona, frequently with the Vienna Philharmonic and the Vienna State Opera, Paris and even as far away as Tokyo.

Her 1985 Zarzuela duet album recorded with Plácido Domingo at the Salzburg Music Festival brought her again to the forefront of Spanish Zarzuela. Both she and Domingo received Grammy Award nominations for Best Classical Vocal Soloist for the album. Her final triumph in Berlin was as Valentine in Les Huguenots in 1987.

Later life
In 1991, the Príncipe de Asturias Foundation awarded the "Generation of Spanish lyric singers" (de los Ángeles, Berganza, Caballé, Carreras, Domingo, Kraus and Lorengar) the Arts award. Lorengar announced her retirement and performed her last concert at the Campoamor Theatre in Oviedo (Asturias), Spain. In 1994, she was awarded the Order of Merit of Berlin.

Pilar Lorengar died of cancer in Berlin, scene of her longest artistic associations, where she resided with her husband, dentist Dr Jürgen Schaff. I.E.S. Pilar Lorengar, a free public vocational high school for the media arts located in her city of birth, Zaragoza, Spain, was named in her honor.

Recordings
She can be seen on black-and-white video in German translation performances from the Deutsche Oper of Don Giovanni (as Donna Elvira) and Don Carlos (as Elizabeth). In both of these performances, she shares the stage with Dietrich Fischer-Dieskau and Josef Greindl.

References

External links
Biography in Castilian from the Municipality of Zaragoza
Artist's biography in English
Background notes on Pilar Lorengar in English from the Prince of Asturias Foundation
Notes in Castilian on Angeles Otein
 Teatro de la Zarzuela (multilingual)
Discography (Capon's Lists of Opera Recordings)
 Eurydice (YouTube) with Marilyn Horne as Orfeo

1928 births
1996 deaths
Deaths from cancer in Germany
People from Zaragoza
Singers from Aragon
Spanish operatic sopranos
Spanish expatriates in Germany
Madrid Royal Conservatory alumni
20th-century Spanish women opera singers
Recipients of the Order of Merit of Berlin